This is a list of films produced in the Philippines in the 1960s. For an alphabetical list, see :Category:Philippine films.

References

External links
Filipino film at the Internet Movie Database

1960s
Films
Philippines